is a railway station on the Hisatsu Line and Yunomae Line in Hitoyoshi, Kumamoto, Japan, operated by Kyushu Railway Company (JR Kyushu) and Kumagawa Railroad.

The name of the Yunomae Line station is officially , which was renamed from Hitoyoshi Station on April 1, 2009.

Lines
Hitoyoshi Station is served by the Hisatsu Line. It is also one terminus of the Kumagawa Railroad Yunomae Line.

Adjacent stations

History
The entire stretch of track from Mojikō through Yatsushiro, Hitoyoshi, Kokubu to Kagoshima was redesignated as the Kagoshima Main Line on 21 November 1909.

By 1927, another track from Yatsushiro through  to Kagoshima had been built and this was now designated as part of the Kagoshima Main Line. The track from Yatsushiro through Hitoyoshi to Kagoshima was thus redesignated as the Hisatsu Line on 17 October 1927.

With the privatization of Japanese National Railways (JNR), the successor of JGR, on 1 April 1987, the station came under the control of JR Kyushu.

See also
 List of railway stations in Japan

References

External links

  

Railway stations in Kumamoto Prefecture
Railway stations in Japan opened in 1909